Madhu M. Mohana (born 6 March 1991) is a Singaporean professional footballer who plays as a right-back or centre-back for Balestier Khalsa and the Singapore national team. He is known for his long throw-ins.

Education 
Madhu graduated from the Singapore Sports School in 2007. He also studied a sports science and coaching diploma course at the International Sports Academy (ISA) and earned a scholarship for a sports management degree with ISA .

Football career

Club career 
Madhu began his football career with Under-23 side Young Lions in the S.League in 2009. He was one of the Young Lions players involved in an on-pitch fight with Beijing Guoan Talent players in their S.League match on 7 September 2010. He was charged by the Football Association of Singapore for gross misconduct and bringing the game into disrepute and was banned for four months and fined S$1,000 for his part in the brawl. Madhu signed with Woodlands Wellington for the 2011 S.League season.

In late 2011, it was announced that Madhu was selected to be part of the new LionsXII team competing in the Malaysia Super League. After the LionsXII disbanded in 2015, Madhu signed for Warriors for the 2016 S.League campaign. On 27 May 2016, he scored his first goal for Warriors FC against Geylang International FC in the RHB Singapore Cup.

In 2017, Madhu joined Tampines Rovers. He was released by the team prior to the start of season. 

In early 2018, Madhu signed for Negeri Sembilan F.A., but he was again released by the team days before the start of 2018 Malaysia Super League season. Madhu re-signed with Tampines Rovers in March the same year. He was released by Tampines Rovers at the end of the 2021 season. He was offered contracts by Singapore Premier League (SPL) clubs and also Thai League 2 clubs but rejected them.

In April 2022, Madhu trained with SPL clubBalestier Khalsa and subsequently signed with Balestier in June.

International career 
Madhu was called up to the Singapore U22 squad which played in the 2013 AFC U-22 Asian Cup qualifiers. He made four appearances during the qualifying round and scored a goal against Timor-Leste.

Madhu was handed his international debut against Laos on 10 October 2013, starting as the team's right-back.

Coaching career 
In 2022, Madhu started a personalised football mentoring service MadKicks.

Other career 
In 2022, Madhu started selling sunglasses via his own business, MadShades.

Career statistics

Club

. Caps and goals may not be correct.

 Young Lions and LionsXII are ineligible for qualification to AFC competitions in their respective leagues.

International

References

1991 births
Living people
Singaporean footballers
Singaporean expatriate footballers
Singapore international footballers
Woodlands Wellington FC players
Negeri Sembilan FA players
Singapore Premier League players
LionsXII players
Association football fullbacks
Singaporean people of Tamil descent
Singaporean sportspeople of Indian descent
Malaysia Super League players
Young Lions FC players
Southeast Asian Games bronze medalists for Singapore
Southeast Asian Games medalists in football
Competitors at the 2013 Southeast Asian Games